The Tuvalu national rugby sevens team (Tuvalu 7s) participates in the Rugby Sevens competitions at the Pacific Games and 
the Oceania Sevens Championship. The Tuvalu Rugby Union (TRU) was established in 2007 as the organising body for Rugby Union in Tuvalu. The TRU selects the members of the Tuvalu 7s.

Tuvalu is a lower ranking rugby nation, with the Tuvalu 7s focusing on skills development. The Tuvalu 7s lost all their matches at the 2011 Pacific Games. and at the 2017 Oceania Sevens Championships

Elenoa Kunatuba was the Tuvalu men’s 7s coach, at the 2019 Pacific Games; she selected seven new players for the games squad.

References

See also

Rugby union in Tuvalu

national
National rugby sevens teams
rugby